Jeritt Thayer (born May 3, 1986 in Corona del Mar, California) is a former American soccer player.

Career

College
Thayer played club soccer for the Irvine Strikers and the Wolfpack Soccer Club, and played college soccer at New York University from 2004 to 2007. He began his college career as a defender and finished it as a midfielder, having scored thirty-five career goals. In 2006, he was a second team Division III All American.

Professional
Thayer turned professional in 2008 when he joined the Wilmington Hammerheads in the USL Second Division. He made his professional debut on April 26, 2008 in Wilmington's opening day 2-0 loss to the Bermuda Hogges.

Honors

Wilmington Hammerheads
USL Second Division Regular Season Champions (1): 2009

References

External links
 Wilmington Hammerheads bio
 Infosport player combine profile

1986 births
Living people
American soccer players
USL Second Division players
USL Championship players
Wilmington Hammerheads FC players
Penn FC players
Association football midfielders